Live in Anaheim may refer to:

 Live in Anaheim (EP), a 2004 EP by Simple Plan
 Live in Anaheim (Ian Gillan album), 2008